Qareh Naz-e Sofla (also Romanized as Qareh Nāz-e Soflá; also known as Qarah Nāz-e Pā'īn) is a village in Qareh Naz Rural District, in the Central District of Maragheh County, East Azerbaijan Province, Iran. At the 2006 census, its population was 90, in 23 families.

References 

Towns and villages in Maragheh County